The Heilmann locomotives were a series of three experimental steam-electric locomotives produced in the 1890s for the French Chemins de fer de l'Ouest (CF de l'Ouest). A prototype was built in 1894 and two larger locomotives were built in 1897. These locomotives used electric transmission, much like later-popular diesel-electric locomotives and various other self powered locomotives.

La Fusée Electrique

In 1890,  registered a patent (France №. 207055) for a self powered electric vehicle; the design was intended to eliminate the unbalanced oscillatory moments and "hammer blow" caused by the cranked action of a conventional mechanical steam locomotive. His design used a balanced steam engine to drive the locomotive via an electrical transmission (an electrical generator driving electric motors via controlling rheostats and switches). Heilmann wished to create a machine specifically suited for high-speed trains without the high costs of an electrified infrastructure. His earliest design was of a trainset consisting of a vehicle with a triple expansion steam engine (of 600 hp.) and generator (providing 480 hp @ 80% expected efficiency), a tender and three carriages. The entire train was to run on bogies, and use a distributed traction system provided by 12 axle-mounted electric motors in the three carriages.

The first real locomotive built to Heilmann's design was a prototype steam-electric locomotive, with boiler, steam engine, generator and motors built into a single locomotive; construction began in 1892 and was completed in August 1893. On completion is was named Fusée (also known as La Fusée Électrique), a reference to the 1830 Stephenson locomotive "Rocket".

The steam engine (designed by Swiss Locomotive and Machine Works (SLM) at Winterthur, Switzerland.) and boiler were built at the Forges et Chantiers de la Méditerranée in Le Havre, the electrical equipment was designed and built at Brown, Boveri & Compagnie of Baden, Switzerland, whilst the locomotive frame and bogies were built at the Compagnie de Materiel de Chemins de Fer.

The engine had a fixed cutoff with no reversing mechanism, and no speed governor excluding a centrifugal overspeed safety device.

The steam engine drove directly a direct current dynamo, rated at approximately 500 kW (1,200 A @ 400 V); it was a six pole machine with the armature constructed on the Gramme dynamo principle with six brushes. The generator's field coils were energised by a separate bipolar dynamo capable of generating 100 A at 100 V, which was directly driven at approximately 300 rpm by a 20 CV two cylinder vertical compound steam engine of similar design to the main engine. This secondary generator's output was also used to provide a supply for electric lighting in carriages.

Electric speed and load control was obtained by reducing the main generator's field excitation current coming from the  dynamo using a twelve step drum rheostat. The eight traction motors were connected in parallel; for low speed control the motors could be series connected in two sets of four connected in parallel.

The motors were located in two four-axle bogies, with wheelset having a sealed axle mounted  electric motor; giving a Do-Do wheel arrangement. Braking was by Westinghouse air brakes, with disc brakes fitted on all wheels. The locomotive was a cab forward design.

The test train consisted of the locomotive (fully fueled to 118 tonnes), four new first class carriages, a dynamometer car, and two vans containing one tonne of batteries between them; the total train weight was 173 to 183 tonnes, depending on passenger levels.

On 9 May 1894, La Fusée Electrique made a trial run from Saint-Lazare station, Paris to Mantes-la-Jolie, hauling a train consisting eight carriages. The  journey took 55 minutes. Following the test run, the locomotive hauled a regular service train back to Paris. Trials showed that the engine used 15% less coal than a conventional steam engine. The locomotive was said to ride "like a Pullman carriage." Criticisms of the locomotive were that it was "too complicated, too costly, too heavy". These same arguments would be repeated with the introduction of main-line diesel-electric locomotives some half a century later. Two larger locomotives were ordered for further trials on the CF de l'Ouest. La Fusée Electrique had been dismantled by 1897, with the bogies being used for two 0-8-0 electric locomotives which were employed on the  underground railway between Saint-Germain Ouest and Grande-Ceinture.

A  scale model of the prototype locomotive made in 1903 is in the collection of the Conservatoire national des arts et métiers, Paris, donated by Heilmann.

CF de l'Ouest 8001 and 8002

In 1897, two larger locomotives were built. They were numbered 8001 and 8002. The steam engines were built by Willans & Robinson, Rugby, Warwickshire, United Kingdom. The driving wheels were arranged in two four-axle bogies as per La Fusée.

On 12 November 1897, a test run was made between the Saint-Lazare, Paris and Mantes-la-Jolie and return. On 18 November 1897, a  test run was made with speeds kept down to  hauling a  load.

Although other railway companies, such as the Ohio River, Madison & Southern Railway in the United States and the Southern Railway in Russia, as well as at least one from Germany, showed interest in steam-electric locomotives, the two locomotives suffered the same fate as their predecessor. They were the ancestors of diesel-electric, and those gas turbine and steam turbine locomotives which use an electric transmission. When one of the first diesel-electric locomotives was reported in 1905, the Automotor Journal stated it appears to be something on the Heilmann principle, that is to say the engine is employed to operate a dynamo which in turn supplies electric current to motors geared to the driving wheels.

See also
 Electric-steam locomotive
 Steam turbine electric locomotive

Notes

References

Sources

Séance du 20 Février 1891 p.105
Plate 31, Plate 32

, (p.162, p.178 alternative links)

Procès-verbal de la séance du 5 Juin 1896 (Minutes of 5 June 1896 session), p.784
Plate 170, Plate 171
,  (alternative link)

External links

Steam locomotives of France
Standard gauge electric locomotives of France
Experimental locomotives
Do-Do locomotives
Scrapped locomotives

de:Heilmann-Lokomotive